The 1835 Pennsylvania gubernatorial election was among three candidates. Incumbent Governor George Wolf ran as an Independent Democrat. In the end Joseph Ritner won the election and became Pennsylvania's only Anti-Masonic governor.

Democratic schism
In March 1835 factionalism came to a head in Pennsylvania's dominant Democratic party as it convened at Harrisburg to nominate its candidate for governor. The supporters of the incumbent Wolf and those of Lutheran pastor Henry Muhlenberg, known respectively as the "Wolves" and the "Mules", deadlocked and adjourned to reconvene at Lewistown in May. The Wolf delegates, however, remained at Harrisburg and in a rump convention renominated the governor. The outraged "Mules" then proceeded as scheduled to Lewistown to nominate Muhlenberg.

The resulting split Democratic vote enabled the Anti-Masons, with Whig support, to finally elect Ritner, who had lost the previous two elections.

Tension between the "Wolves" and the "Mules" lasted until the mid-1840s.

Results

References

1835
Pennsylvania
Gubernatorial
November 1835 events